Desert, California may refer to:
Desert, Los Angeles County, California
Desert, San Bernardino County, California

See also
 High Desert (California)